Adama Touré (born 28 August 1991), often simply known as Adama, is a Malian professional footballer who plays as a central midfielder.

Club career
Born in Bamako, Adama joined Paris Saint-Germain's youth setup in 2009, after starting with Stade Malien. He made his senior debuts with the reserves in the 2010–11 season. A season later, he signed with Lorient, being assigned to the reserve team in the same category.

On 20 January 2012, Adama signed with Spanish club Sporting de Gijón, being initially assigned to the B-team in Segunda División B. On 25 May of the following year he made his first team debut, playing the last 14 minutes of a 2–1 away loss against SD Huesca, in the Segunda División championship.

On 10 September 2015, free agent Adama signed for CE Sabadell FC, recently relegated to the third tier.

On 27 August 2017, Adama signed for Real Avilés after one year without playing.

References

External links

1991 births
Living people
Sportspeople from Bamako
Malian footballers
Mali under-20 international footballers
Malian expatriate footballers
Association football midfielders
Malian expatriate sportspeople in France
Malian expatriate sportspeople in Spain
Segunda División players
Segunda División B players
Sporting de Gijón B players
Sporting de Gijón players
CE Sabadell FC footballers
SC Schiltigheim players
21st-century Malian people